Anton Storch (1 April 1892 – 26 November 1975) was a German trade unionist, politician, a member of the Christian Democratic Union (CDU) and the minister of labor from 1949 to 1957.

Early life
Storch was born in Fulda, Hesse, in 1892. He was trained as a carpenter and served in World War I.

Career
Storch was the functionary of Woodworker's Christian Trade Union from 1920 to 1933, trade union chairman of Hanover region from 1931 to 1933 and insurance agent until 1939. From 1939 to 1945 he served as a member of air raid police. He contributed to the reestablishment of the trade unions in Hanover (British Zone) in 1945 and 1946. From 1946 to 1948, he served as the chief of department for social policy of British Zone trade unions. He became a member of Bizonal Economic Council in 1947 and was named its director of labor in 1948. He was the director of the workers' union (Verwaltung für Arbeit (VfA)) until 1949.

He was a member of the Christian Democratic Union (CDU) and one of the CDU representatives in the Bundestag. He became a member of the Bundestag in 1949 and served there until 1965. In the party he served at the social affairs committee. Then he was appointed minister of labor and social affairs to the cabinet led by Prime Minister Konrad Adenauer on 20 September 1949. He was in office until 29 October 1957 when Theodor Blank replaced him in the post.

Views
Storch was an advocate of "far-reaching social welfare programme" and of Catholic political economy. He argued that the reason for two world wars was the "exaggerated liberal-capitalistic economic order of the last one hundred years."

References

External links
 
 

1892 births
1975 deaths
Labor ministers (Germany)
Grand Crosses 1st class of the Order of Merit of the Federal Republic of Germany
Members of the Bundestag for the Christian Democratic Union of Germany
Members of the Bundestag for Lower Saxony
Members of the Bundestag 1961–1965
Members of the Bundestag 1957–1961
Members of the Bundestag 1953–1957
Members of the Bundestag 1949–1953
People from Fulda
People of the Cold War
Social Affairs ministers of Germany